First Lieutenant Oliver Colwell (1834 to October 12, 1872) was an American soldier who fought in the American Civil War. Colwell received the country's highest award for bravery during combat, the Medal of Honor, for his action during the Battle of Nashville in Tennessee on 16 December 1864. He was honored with the award on 24 February 1865.

Biography
Colwell was born in Champaign County, Ohio in 1834. He enlisted into the 95th Ohio Infantry. He died on 12 October 1872 and his remains are interred at the Woodstock Cemetery in Ohio.

Medal of Honor citation

See also

List of American Civil War Medal of Honor recipients: A–F

References

1834 births
1872 deaths
People of Ohio in the American Civil War
Union Army officers
United States Army Medal of Honor recipients
American Civil War recipients of the Medal of Honor